Anthony Barbosa born in Raia, Goa is an Indian football player.

Career

Youth career
Barbosa comes from Raia, Goa and began his football career with the Raia SC for the U-15 team. He used to watch a lot of tournaments. "He used to watch the teams play, their styles and compare himself to them. He then attended the Salgaocar Youth development football trials. Within 2 years, he was selected for Salgaocar’s senior team.

Salgaocar
During the course of his first season Barbosa played in only five games and scored two goals.

Churchill Brothers
On 26 May 2013 it was announced that Barbosa has signed for Churchill Brothers. 
He made his debut for Churchill Brothers in the I-League on 21 September 2013 against Salgaocar at the Duler Stadium; as Churchill Brothers lost the match 1–0.

International
Barbosa was first selected to the India U-23 team in June 2011 for the 2012 Olympics qualifier against Qatar but did not feature in any of the two matches.

References

External links
 http://www.goal.com/en-india/people/india/36242/anthony-barbosa

Indian footballers
1989 births
Living people
People from Margao
Footballers from Goa
I-League players
Salgaocar FC players
Churchill Brothers FC Goa players
Association football midfielders